Tesen may refer to:

 New Tesen, Nagaland, India, a village
 Old Tesen, Nagaland, India, a village